In statistics, an adaptive estimator is an estimator in a parametric or semiparametric model with nuisance parameters such that the presence of these nuisance parameters does not affect efficiency of estimation.

Definition
Formally, let parameter θ in a parametric model consists of two parts: the parameter of interest , and the nuisance parameter . Thus . Then we will say that  is an adaptive estimator of ν in the presence of η if this estimator is regular, and efficient for each of the submodels
 
Adaptive estimator estimates the parameter of interest equally well regardless whether the value of the nuisance parameter is known or not.

The necessary condition for a regular parametric model to have an adaptive estimator is that
 
where zν and  zη are components of the score function corresponding to parameters ν and η respectively, and thus Iνη is the top-right k×m block of the Fisher information matrix I(θ).

Example
Suppose  is the normal location-scale family:
 
Then the usual estimator  is adaptive: we can estimate the mean equally well whether we know the variance or not.

Notes

Basic references

Other useful references
I. V. Blagouchine and E. Moreau: "Unbiased Adaptive Estimations of the Fourth-Order Cumulant for Real Random Zero-Mean Signal", IEEE Transactions on Signal Processing, vol. 57, no. 9, pp. 3330–3346, September 2009.

Estimator